Arthur Zimmerman may refer to:

 Arthur Zimmermann (1864–1940), State Secretary for Foreign Affairs of the German Empire
 Arthur Augustus Zimmerman (1869–1936), cycling sprint rider

See also
Arthur Zimmermann (1864–1940), State Secretary for Foreign Affairs of the German Empire